William L. Hanaway (1929-2018) was an American scholar and professor of Asian and Middle Eastern Studies at the University of Pennsylvania. He was a president of the Association for Iranian Studies (2000). He was also a member of the Editorial Board of A History of Persian Literature and a consultant and contributor to the Encyclopœdia Iranica.

Bibliography 

 Literacy in the Persianate World: Writing and the Social Order, 2012
 Reading Nastaliq: Persian and Urdu Hands from 1500 to the Present (English, Persian and Urdu Edition), 2007
 Studies in Pakistani Popular Culture, 1996

Awards 

 Research Foundation Awards for “Analytical Description of the Tashkent Dialect of Uzbek” in 1992

References

Iranologists
1929 births
2018 deaths
University of Pennsylvania faculty